William fitz Nigel (died 1134), of Halton Castle in Cheshire, England, was Constable of Chester and Baron of Halton within the county palatine of Chester ruled by the Earl of Chester.

Origins
Traditionally, he succeeded his father Nigel as baron of Halton and Constable of Chester, although modern sources doubt the position was held by his father. He held lands in Halton, throughout Cheshire and also in Normandy. Through his heiress mother he obtained Widnes and the Lancashire manors of Widnes, Appleton, Cronton and Rainhill. In 1115 he established Runcorn Priory, of the Augustinian Order of Canons Regular. He died in 1134 at Halton Castle and was buried at Chester.

Marriage and issue
By his wife, Agnes, daughter of Gilbert de Gant and Alice de Montfort, he had issue including:
William (d. 1149), who succeeded his father at Halton and in the constableship, but died without issue, when Halton and the constableship passed to the descendants of his eldest sister Agnes
Agnes, who became heiress to her childless brother William, and married Eustace fitz John by whom she had issue
Leucha, who married Robert de Mohaut and had issue
Matilda, who married Albert de Grelle and had issue

Notes

References

 
 
 
 

1134 deaths
12th-century English nobility
Year of birth unknown
Barons of Halton